Palle Lykke Jensen (4 November 1936 – 19 April 2013) was a Danish cyclist who was active between 1956 and 1969. He competed at the 1956 Summer Olympics in the road race, but failed to finish. The same year he finished fourth at the world road championships. Starting from 1958 Jensen won four consecutive national sprint titles. Between 1958 and 1968 he also won six medals at European track championships and 21 six-day races out of 122 starts in Germany, Canada, Denmark, Belgium, Netherlands and UK. After marrying the daughter of Belgian cyclist Rik Van Steenbergen, in 1962 he moved to Belgium, where he worked at the Port of Antwerp.

References

1936 births
2013 deaths
Olympic cyclists of Denmark
Cyclists at the 1956 Summer Olympics
Danish male cyclists
Danish track cyclists
People from Faaborg-Midtfyn Municipality
Sportspeople from the Region of Southern Denmark